Gliddon  is a surname. Notable people with the surname include: 

Bill Gliddon (1896–1974), Australian rules footballer
Cameron Gliddon (born 1989), Australian basketball player
George Gliddon (1809–1857), Anglo-American Egyptologist
Katie Edith Gliddon (1883–1967), British watercolour artist and suffragette